Teresa S. Lubbers currently serves as president of Sagamore Institute, a think tank. She was Indiana Commissioner for Higher Education from 2009 to 2020. She served from 1992 to 2009 as a Republican member of the Indiana Senate, representing the 30th District. She resigned in 2009 and was replaced by former Indianapolis City-County Councilman Scott Schneider, who served the rest of her term.

Political career
Lubbers was elected to represent the 30th District in the Indiana Senate in November 1992 with 73% of the vote. Lubbers was re-elected in 1996, 2000, 2004, and 2008. She represents parts of Marion and Hamilton Counties. During her time in the Indiana Senate, she served on a number of committees, including Education, Judiciary (Courts and Juvenile Justice Subcommittee), Pensions & Labor, and Planning & Economic Development Committee.

Electoral history

Family life
Lubbers lives in Indianapolis with her husband Mark Lubbers and two daughters.

References

External links
Inside Indiana Business - Lubber Set to Begin as Commissioner for Higher Education News report on Lubbers' confirmation
Project Vote Smart - Senator Teresa S. Lubbers (IN) profile

Indiana state senators
Living people
Politicians from Indianapolis
Indiana University alumni
Women state legislators in Indiana
1951 births
Harvard Kennedy School alumni
21st-century American women